Rizwan Ahmed (born 1 October 1978) is a Pakistani former cricketer. He is an all-rounder, batting right-handed and bowling right-arm leg-spin bowler. He is uncle of Nauman Ali and is now based in Pennsylvania, the United States.

Rizwan has played for Hyderabad since his debut in 1999, occasionally also representing Khan Research Laboratories.  He made his debut against Zimbabwe in 2008 in the absence of several more senior players.  Although his fielding was praised, the Zimbabwean batsmen hit 26 runs from his four overs and he was unable to take a wicket.

References

External links

1978 births
Living people
Pakistan One Day International cricketers
Pakistani cricketers
Hyderabad (Pakistan) cricketers
Khan Research Laboratories cricketers
Sindh cricketers
Sui Southern Gas Company cricketers
Cricketers from Hyderabad, Sindh